Armando Pedro (born 2 September 1971 in Moçâmedes, Angola) is an Angolan football coach and retired footballer who coaches Blue Waters of the Namibia Premier League.

Namibia

Journeying to Namibia through his friend who was a member of the People's Liberation Army of Namibia, Pedro first competed for the Ongwediva-based African United but had difficulty communicating with the locals. Soon, he was invited to trial for Liverpool Okahandja but African United needed him for a tournament. However, after winning the competition the Angolan decided to go to Blue Waters instead, forming an attack partnership with Striker Muaine and propelling Blue Waters to the 1994 Namibia FA Cup and 1996 Namibia Premier League titles. Spending some years in South Africa, the talismanic forward returned to the club in 2005, leading their front line in the CAF Champions league as well as the domestic championship. Serving as assistant and interim coach for Blue Waters in the wake of his retirement, Pedro severed his 14-year tie with them to concentrate on business in 2016, opening a clothing shop in Walvis Bay.

References

1971 births
Living people
Angolan football managers
Angolan footballers
Angolan expatriate football managers
Angolan expatriate footballers
Angolan expatriate sportspeople in South Africa
Association football forwards
Blue Waters F.C. players
Expatriate footballers in Namibia
Expatriate soccer players in South Africa
Hellenic F.C. players
Namibia Premier League managers
Namibian people of Angolan descent
People from Namibe Province
Namibia Premier League players